Weiske's tiger (Parantica weiskei) is a species of nymphalid butterfly in the Danainae subfamily. It is found in Indonesia and Papua New Guinea.

References

Parantica
Butterflies described in 1901
Taxonomy articles created by Polbot